Boo-Terek (before 2001: Ключевка Klyuchevka) is a village in the Talas Region of Kyrgyzstan. It is part of the Bakay-Ata District. Its population was 6,342 in 2021.

Population

References

Populated places in Talas Region